Khorol Airfield, also known in the US intelligence community as Khorol East, is a Soviet Naval Aviation base in Primorsky Krai, Russia located  east of Khorol, Russia.  Khorol was designed as a heavy bomber airfield.  It was subordinate to the Far East Air Army.  However it was largely a Soviet Naval Aviation base.

After a runway extension in 1964 from 2500 m to 3700 m it had one of the largest runways in eastern Russia.

It was jointly occupied by two regiments of the Pacific Fleet Air Force.  One of these was the 5264 ODRAP (Independent Long-Range Reconnaissance Aviation Regiment) operating Tupolev Tu-142 Bear aircraft.  The other was a Tupolev Tu-16 Badger bomber regiment which numbered as many as 71 aircraft in a 1964 survey.

The other major heavy bomber base in Primorskiy Krai is Vozdvizhenka air base, 39 mi (62 km) to the southwest.  It targets the United States and has nuclear storage facilities, while Khorol's interest is primarily Pacific naval activity and has no nuclear storage.

References

Soviet Air Force bases